is a Japanese football player. He currently plays for Fagiano Okayama in J2 League

Club statistics
Updated to 10 August 2022.

1Includes Promotion Playoffs to J1.

References

External links

1988 births
Living people
Ritsumeikan University alumni
Association football people from Shimane Prefecture
Japanese footballers
J1 League players
J2 League players
Japan Football League players
V-Varen Nagasaki players
Hokkaido Consadole Sapporo players
Fagiano Okayama players
Association football goalkeepers